HD 30479 (HR 1531) is a solitary star in the southern circumpolar constellation Mensa. It has an apparent magnitude of 6.04, making it barely visible to the naked eye even under ideal conditions.

This yields a radius 17.99 times that of the Sun at its estimated distance. At present it has 1.28 times the mass of the Sun and radiates at 116 times the luminosity of the Sun at an effective temperature of 4,390 K from its enlarged photosphere, which gives it an orange glow. HD 30479 is believed to be one of the metal-deficient members of the young disk population with an iron abundance 71% that of the Sun.

References 

K-type giants
Mensa (constellation)
Durchmusterung objects
030479
021611
1531
Mensae, 13